In astrophysics, a magnetic mirror point is a point where the motion of a charged particle trapped in a magnetic field (such as the (approximately) dipole field of the Earth) reverses its direction.  More precisely, it  is the point where the projection of the particle's velocity vector in the direction of the field vector is equal to zero.

See also 
 Magnetic mirror
 L-shell
 Dipole model of the Earth's magnetic field
 List of artificial radiation belts

References

Astrophysics